The subdivisions of Portugal are based on a complicated administrative structure. The second-level administrative division, after the 5 regions and 2 autonomous regions, is 308 municipalities (concelhos) which are further subdivided into 3091 civil parishes (freguesias).

Administrative divisions of Portugal

Subdivisions of Portugal

Urban hierarchy

In Portugal, urban centers (cities, towns and hamlets) have no legal authority and are social constructs based on a series of institutional functions. In fact, administrative power lies within the extraterritorial municipalities and parishes. These have authority in the constitution and may include various towns within each territory and may have their own constituent assemblies and executives. The town or city, generally, does not correspond to the boundaries of various municipalities, with the exception of the entirely urban municipalities (such as Lisbon, Porto, Funchal, Amadora, Entroncamento and São João da Madeira). The municipality with the most cities is Paredes Municipality which contains four cities.

Former subdivisions of Portugal

Ancillary divisions

Statistical

Communication

Ambiguity
Due to changes throughout history, the Portuguese unitary state has seen a continuous process of centralisation and de-centralisation, resulting in changes to the toponymy of various territorial divisions. Consequently, the many names have been appropriated at different levels to represent alterations to the geographic map of the country. This is particularly the case with the transitive period between the medieval provinces and 19th century Liberal reforms. Further, the influence of the Nationalist movement during the 20th century, resulted in the re-appearance of toponymic names long since abandoned.

The modern unitary state is influenced considerable by names passed between generations, and have been applied and re-applied, resulting in a historical ambiguity in the historical record, where one name may be used for two different areas. As is the case with the following examples: 
 Minho: Province / Subregion
 Alto Alentejo: Province / Subregion
 Baixo Alentejo: Province / Subregion
 Douro Litoral: Province / Subregion
 Trás-os-Montes: region / Province
 Estremadura Province: two different ones
 Beira Litoral: postal region, 1936 province
Even between administrative level there several instances where the same name is used to represent a territorial division at the local, municipal or regional level.

References

Bibliography
 

 

pt:Subdivisões de Portugal